Princess Maria Theresa of Braganza,  (Maria Teresa Carolina Micaela Ana Josefina Antónia Francisca de Assis e de Paula Brígida Pia Gerardina Severina Inácia Luísa Estanislau Joana Policarpa; 26 January 1881 – 17 January 1945) was a member of the House of Braganza. Through her marriage to Prince Karl Ludwig of Thurn and Taxis, Maria Theresa was also a member of the House of Thurn and Taxis.

Family

Maria Theresa was born in Ödenburg, Austria-Hungary (now Sopron, Hungary), the only daughter of the Miguelist pretender to the Portuguese throne Miguel, Duke of Braganza and his first wife Princess Elisabeth of Thurn and Taxis. Maria Theresa's father was the head of the non-reigning branch of the Portuguese Royal House that had been exiled from Portugal. The exile was the result of the Portuguese law of banishment of 1834 and the constitution of 1838 which was brought about because his grandfather Miguel I of Portugal had in 1828 usurped the throne of Portugal from Queen Maria II. Her grandfather reigned as king until 1834 when Maria II was restored.

Marriage and issue

Maria Theresa married Prince Karl Ludwig of Thurn and Taxis (1863–1942), a member of the Czech branch of the family, son of Prince Maximilian Karl Friedrich of Thurn and Taxis and his wife Amélie Eugénie de Tascher de La Pagerie, on 22 May 1900 in Regensburg, Bavaria, Germany. Maria Theresa and Karl Ludwig had one son:

Prince Maximilian of Thurn and Taxis (1913–1928)

Ancestry

References

1881 births
1945 deaths
House of Braganza
Portuguese infantas
Princesses of Thurn und Taxis
People from Sopron